The Marais Audomarois is a wetland biosphere reserve in the north of France. The renowned Ramsar site covers some 22 300 hectares, including the city Saint-Omer.

Geography 
The Audomarois landscape owes its richness to its particular geography. It is located on an intersection between three natural regions: the coastal plain, the Flanders intérieure and the Artois hills.

These multifaceted landscapes are host to a wide variety of flora and fauna. The main natural habitats are reedbeds, tall herbs, peaty woods, meadows, ditches and rivers. The many species of flora include aquatic vegetation such as flowering rush (Butomus umbellatus), greater spearwort (Ranunculus lingua) and marsh fern (Thelypteris palustris), as well as underwater and floating vegetation. These habitat types enable many species of birds to breed, feed and rest.

There are also a number of endangered species in the region, including cowbane (Cicuta virosa), river water-dropwort (Oenanthe fluviatilis) and  water soldier (Stratiotes aloides).

The natural heritage of the reserve is especially remarkable for the abundance and variety of its waterbird communities. Located on major migration routes, the Audomarois marsh provides food and necessary rest for birds such as sedge warblers (Acrocephalus schoenobaenus), the bluethroat (Luscinia svecica), the warbler effarvate (Acrocephalus scirpaceus) and the rare aquatic warbler (Acrocephalus paludicola).

In view of this natural wealth (flora, fauna and landscapes), the Audomarois marsh enjoys several forms of protected status, including inscription as a Natura 2000 Site, a National Nature Reserve, a Regional Natural Reserve and a Regional Natural Park. Since 2008, the wetland has also been recognized as a place of international importance under the Ramsar Convention.

Socioeconomic characteristics 
Since the seventeenth century, market gardening activities have promoted the development and creation of these landscapes, which are still preserved today. The reserve is also a highly valued site for leisure and tourism.

References

Sources 

Biosphere reserves of France
Ramsar sites in Metropolitan France
Saint-Omer